Mid-State Regional Airport  (Mid-State Airport) is a small airport in Rush Township, Centre County in Pennsylvania, between Black Moshannon State Park to the east and Moshannon State Forest. 

History

"Black Moshannon Airport" was built on land taken from Black Moshannon State Park and Moshannon State Forest just before the Second World War, and was operational by 1942, hosting a Civil Air Patrol training exercise for nearly 300 planes on May 30, 1942. It was renamed "Mid-State Airport" in 1962.

The March 1951 diagram shows the 163/343 runway 3400 feet long and the 056/236 runway 3000 feet. In May 1962 both runways were 5000 feet; in September 1968 16/34 was 5710 feet.

In 1949-53 All American Airways DC-3s stopped at Albert airport north of Philipsburg . Allegheny Airlines moved to PSB in 1953-54; Allegheny Commuter took over from 1973 to 1981. In 1978 Allegheny Commuter began shifting to University Park Airport, owned by Penn State; Mid-State Regional Airport now has no scheduled airline.

In 2008 the name is "Mid-State Regional Airport" and it has been designated a Keystone Opportunity Zone (KOZ). However, there are limitations in state law that prohibit any further development on park or forest lands.

Facilities
In the year ending June 30, 2007 the airport had 2,550 aircraft operations: 98% general aviation and 2% military. Two aircraft are based at the airport. 

All of the taxiways are asphalt except for E, which is turf for the last  before the runway.

Other Users
Based at Mid-State Regional Airport is the Civil Air Patrol Mid-State Composite Squadron 239.  The Pennsylvania Bureau of Forestry bases a fire fighting aircraft at the airport during forest fire season.

The Central Pennsylvania Region Sports Car Club of America holds autocross races at the airport.  The airport remains active during the races; when an aircraft wishes to land, the race will be suspended, the aircraft will land, and racing will resume.  This is possible due to the nature of autocross racing, where one car is on the course at a time.

References

External links
 Mid-State Regional Airport, official website
 
 

Airports in Pennsylvania
County airports in Pennsylvania
Transportation buildings and structures in Centre County, Pennsylvania